Anton Ondruš (born 27 March 1950 in Solčany, Czechoslovakia) is a former Slovak football player and considered one of the best defenders of the seventies.

Early club career 
He started to play regularly for Slovan Bratislava in the fall of 1970. With this club, he won the Czechoslovak League in 1974 and 1975, and he later become the captain of this team, playing in total in 210 matches and scoring 38 goals. The team won the Czechoslovak Cup in 1974.

International career 

Ondruš played 58 matches for Czechoslovakia and scored 9 goals. As a captain, he led the national team in the 1976 UEFA European Championship. His superb performance against Cruyff's Netherlands in semi-finals where he scored twice (one own goal) opened his team the door to the final match where Czechoslovakia won the gold medal in the famous Belgrade Night game against the then world champion West Germany. At the 1980 UEFA European Championship, he contributed to the national team's bronze medal.

Later career 

1981 Ondruš changed to Club Brugge K.V. to Belgium, but he played only nine games. From 1983 till 1987 he played in the French club CS Thonon-les-Bains and towards the end of his career at FC Biel-Bienne, Switzerland.

1997 he was a president of Slovan Bratislava for a short period. Currently he works in Switzerland.

Honours
Czechoslovakia
UEFA European Championship: 1976

Individual
UEFA European Championship Team of the Tournament: 1976

References 

 

Living people
1950 births
People from Topoľčany District
Sportspeople from the Nitra Region
Slovak footballers
Czechoslovak footballers
Czechoslovakia international footballers
Association football sweepers
ŠK Slovan Bratislava players
Club Brugge KV players
Belgian Pro League players
UEFA Euro 1976 players
UEFA Euro 1980 players
UEFA European Championship-winning players
UEFA European Championship-winning captains
Czechoslovak expatriate footballers
Expatriate footballers in Belgium
Expatriate footballers in Switzerland
Czechoslovak expatriate sportspeople in Switzerland
Czechoslovak expatriate sportspeople in Belgium
FK Dukla Banská Bystrica players
FC Biel-Bienne players
Czechoslovak expatriate sportspeople in France